Die Privatsekretärin may refer to:
 Die Privatsekretärin (1931 film), a German film
 Die Privatsekretärin (1953 film), a German film

See also
 Sunshine Susie, a 1931 American film
 Dactylo, a French film
 The Private Secretary (1931), an Italian film